The discography for Collin Raye, an American country music singer, comprises 12 studio albums and 39 singles. Four of Raye's singles have reached Number One on the U.S. country singles charts: "Love, Me," "In This Life," "My Kind of Girl" and "I Can Still Feel You." Twenty-one of his singles have reached Top 10 on the same chart, including 14 singles reaching the top 10 consecutively between 1991 and 1996.

Besides his peaks on the country charts, Raye has reached the Billboard Hot 100 four times: first with the #87 peak of "One Boy, One Girl" in 1995, then with the #37 of "Someone You Used to Know" in 1998. His other two were "Anyone Else" which reached #37 in 1999 and "Couldn't Last a Moment" which reached #43 in 2000. Two of his singles charted on the U.S. adult contemporary singles chart: "In This Life" reached #21 in 1992 and "The Gift" which featured Jim Brickman and Susan Ashton reached #3 in 1997.

Studio albums

1990s

2000s

2010s

Compilation albums

Holiday albums

Children's music albums

Live albums

Extended plays

Singles

1991-2000

2001-present

Other singles

Featured singles

Other charted songs

Videography

Video albums

Music videos

See also
The Wrays

Notes
A^ Tracks also peaked at number 8 on the Canadian RPM Country Albums.
B^ "What If Jesus Comes Back Like That" charted as an album cut in 1995 before being released as a single in 1996.
C^ "The Gift" was released only to the Adult Contemporary format, and entered the country charts from unsolicited airplay.

References

Country music discographies
 
 
Discographies of American artists